Richard Goodwin (born 8 March 1987) is a Filipino-Australian sportsman who has represented the Philippines national cricket team, national rugby league team, and national rugby sevens team.

Sporting career

Cricket
Goodwin plays for the Cromer Cricket Club in the Manly Warringah Cricket Association, where he captains the First Grade side. In March 2019, he was named in the Philippines squad for the Regional Finals of the 2018–19 ICC T20 World Cup East Asia-Pacific Qualifier tournament. He made his Twenty20 International (T20I) debut for the Philippines against Papua New Guinea on 22 March 2019.

In February 2022, he was named in the Philippines' team for the 2022 ICC Men's T20 World Cup Global Qualifier A tournament in Oman.

Rugby sevens
Goodwin represented the Philippines in rugby sevens at the 2012 Shanghai Sevens. He kicked a conversion in the match against .

Rugby league
Goodwin has represented the Philippines in rugby league since the team's formation in 2012. He was a member of their squad for the 2018 Emerging Nations World Championship. After a two-year hiatus from professional competition by the Philippines, Goodwin appeared in their international return against Brazil on 13 June 2021.

References

External links
 

1987 births
Living people
Australian people of Filipino descent
Filipino cricketers
Filipino rugby league players
Filipino rugby union players
Philippines national rugby league team captains
Philippines national rugby league team players
Philippines Twenty20 International cricketers
Place of birth missing (living people)
Rugby league fullbacks